Kincardine and Deeside was formerly (1975–96) a local government district in the Grampian Region of Scotland. In 1996 it was included in the Aberdeenshire unitary area.

History
This region is rich in prehistory with numerous megalithic sites, notable in the earliest period of recorded history with several significant Roman sites. The region is also traversed by several ancient trackways across the Grampian Mounth, including the Causey Mounth and Elsick Mounth. In addition there is evidence of ancient burials from the Beaker Period.

Places of interest
Dunnottar Castle
Fowlsheugh Nature Reserve
Muchalls Castle
Portlethen Moss

See also
Subdivisions of Scotland

Line notes

References
 C. Michael Hogan (2007) Elsick Mounth, The Megalithic Portal, ed A. Burnham
 A. Small, Margaret Bruce and Ian A.G. Shepherd (1988) A Beaker Child Burial from Catterline, Kincardine and Deeside, Proc. Soc. Antiquaries Scotland 118: 71-77

 
Politics of Aberdeenshire